Standard is an unincorporated community in Kanawha County, West Virginia, United States. The community is located near Exit 74 on the West Virginia Turnpike (Interstates 64 and 77) north of the Fayette County line.

References

Unincorporated communities in Kanawha County, West Virginia
Unincorporated communities in West Virginia